Ouston is a small settlement in south west Northumberland, England in the North Pennines Area of Outstanding Natural Beauty  north-east of Alston by road, and just west of Ninebanks.

References

External links

Villages in Northumberland